Armina semperi is a species of sea slug, a nudibranch, a marine gastropod mollusk in the family Arminidae.

There is one variety Armina semperi var. erythraea Pruvot-Fol, 1933

Description
This species can be identified by the thin black and white ridges that run longitudinally down its back. The animal also has a characteristic light-blue foot rimmed in yellow-orange, with a matching oral veil.

Members of this species are generally between 2-6 centimeters long, with narrow bodies.

Life habits
Individuals of Armina semperi are more likely to be active at night.

They generally eat soft corals and sea pens.

A picture of Armina semperi can be viewed on the online "Sea Slug Forum" website.

Reference

External links
 SeaSlug Forum, image of live specimen at: 
 Taxonomy at: 

Arminidae
Gastropods described in 1861